Grossbeckia semimaculata is a species of moth in the family Geometridae first described by William Barnes and James Halliday McDunnough in 1912. It is found in North America.

The MONA or Hodges number for Grossbeckia semimaculata is 7283.

References

Further reading

 
 

Hydriomenini
Articles created by Qbugbot
Moths described in 1912